Richard John Hughes (born July 3, 1965) is a former professional soccer player. Born in Swansea, Wales, he moved to Victoria, British Columbia, Canada in 1971. He played for Cadboro Bay, which later became Bays United Soccer Club. He attended Mount Douglas Secondary School, where he played on a soccer team with Jeff Mallett and Simon Keith.

Hughes represented Canada at the 1982 CONCACAF Youth Tournament in Guatemala and won his first cap with Canada's senior team on 27 August 1986 at the Merlion Cup in Singapore. He played for the University of Victoria Vikings and was part of the 1987 national winning side. He played professionally for the Vancouver 86ers, Winnipeg Fury, Victoria Vistas, and Hamilton Steelers of the Canadian Soccer League.

Hughes' father, Brian, was also a professional soccer player.

References

External links
 

1965 births
Living people
Footballers from Swansea
Welsh emigrants to Canada
Soccer players from Victoria, British Columbia
Canadian soccer players
Association football defenders
University of Victoria alumni
Canada men's international soccer players
Canadian Soccer League (1987–1992) players
Victoria Vistas players
Canada men's youth international soccer players
Hamilton Steelers (1981–1992) players
Winnipeg Fury players